Tavarnelle may refer to places in Italy:

Tavernelle, Licciana Nardi, a populated place in Licciana Nardi, Lunigiana
, a populated place in province of Vicenza, Veneto
, a populated place in Colli al Metauro, Marche
Tavernelle, Panicale, a populated place in Panicale, Umbria

See also
Tavarnelle (disambiguation)